The Australian cricket team toured the West Indies between 16 May and 6 July 2008, outside the normal West Indies cricket season. Australia won two of three Test matches played (one being a draw) and all five One-day Internationals. The West Indies won the single Twenty20 International game.

Squads

Tour matches

Three-day : Jamaica Select XI vs Australians

50-over : University of West Indies Vice Chancellor's XI v Australians

Test series

1st Test

2nd Test

3rd Test

T20I series

Only T20I

ODI series

1st ODI

2nd ODI

3rd ODI

4th ODI

5th ODI

References 

2008 in Australian cricket
2008
International cricket competitions in 2008
West Indian cricket seasons from 2000–01
2008 in West Indian cricket